FullContact Inc. is a privately held technology company that provides a suite of cloud-based software products for businesses, developers, and brands. Their main focus is Identity Resolution. Their suite of offerings include products like Enrich and Resolve, and nine solutions, including Customer Recognition and Media Amplification.

FullContact is headquartered in Denver, Colorado, U.S., and Kochi (India).

History
FullContact was founded in 2010 by Bart Lorang, Travis Todd, and Dan Lynn and went through the Techstars Boulder accelerator in 2011.  Over the history of the company, it has raised approximately $50 million in venture-capital financing. In 2015 Bart Lorang confirmed in an interview that FullContact indexed over 1.5 billion people.

 In July 2012, FullContact announced a "Paid Paid Vacation" policy. As part of the policy, employees are awarded US$7,500 annually to use on vacation with the only stipulations being that the employee take a vacation, disconnect from technology, and not work while on vacation.
 In 2014, FullContact acquired a Latvian startup company which developed Cobook.
 In 2016, FullContact acquired an Indian startup company Profoundis Labs Pvt Ltd.
 In 2017, FullContact acquired Mattermark, an aggregator of data about startups and other companies.
 In February 2018, FullContact acquired Contacts+, a mobile contact management application.
 In August 2020, Bart Lorang appointed Chris Harrison to succeed him as CEO.

The company has been criticized for linking users' mobile advertising IDs with their personal data, but the company disputes that it offers this service.

Recognition

November 2012, FullContact's CEO and co-founder Bart Lorang named Entrepreneur of the Year by the Colorado Technology Association.
 June 2013, FullContact's CEO and co-founder Bart Lorang named finalist for Mountain Desert Region Ernst & Young Entrepreneur of the Year Award.
 October 2014, FullContact named to Outside's Best Places to Work 2014.
 November 2015, FullContact named Best Mobile App for Business by the Mobby Awards.
 November 2015, FullContact named to Outside's Best Places to Work 2015.
 July 2016, FullContact named a two-time finalist to the SaaS Awards for Best Enterprise-Level SaaS Product and Best Data-Driven SaaS Product.
 November 2016, FullContact named to Outside's Best Places to Work 2016.
 February 2017, FullContact named to Entrepreneur's Top Company Cultures 2017.
 November 2017, FullContact named to Outside's Best Places to Work 2017.
 August 2018, FullContact named number 1100 on the Inc. 5000 fastest-growing private companies in America.
August 2019, FullContact's India office is certified as Great Place to Work® by the GPTW Institute.
October 2020, Jaison Abey Sabu, FullContact India's then Director of Customer Support, wins the "Great People Manager" from Great Manager Institute.
February 2021, FullContact divests of Contacts+.

References

External links
 

Companies based in Denver